Extrechinato y Tú was a musical project by Robe Iniesta (Extremoduro), Iñaki "Uoho" Antón (Platero y Tú and Extremoduro) and Fito Cabrales (Platero y Tú and Fito & Fitipaldis). It is a tribute to the poet Manolo Chinato. The unique album of this supergroup Poesía Básica puts music to the poems by Manolo Chinato so most of the lyrics are verses made by him.

Members 
 Manolo Chinato - Lyrics and vocals
 Roberto Iniesta, "Robe" (Extremoduro) - Guitar and vocals
 Fito Cabrales (Platero y Tú, Fito & Fitipaldis) - Guitar, vocals and lyrics
 Iñaki "Uoho" Antón (Platero y Tú, Extremoduro, Inconscientes) - Guitar and bass

Extra staff 
 José Ignacio Cantera (Extremoduro, Inconscientes) - Drums
 Jesús García "Maguila" (Platero y Tú, La Gripe) - Drums
 Ricardo Cantera - Drums
 Javier Alzola (Fito & Fitipaldis) - Saxophone
 Gino Pavone (Fito & Fitipaldis) - Percussion
 José Alberto Bátiz (Fito & Fitipaldis) - Slide guitar

Poesía básica

Chart performance

References 

Spanish hard rock musical groups